Matthew Wilson Slater (born September 9, 1985) is an American football wide receiver for the New England Patriots of the National Football League (NFL). He played college football at UCLA, where he received first-team All-Pac-10 honors, and was selected by the Patriots in the fifth round of the 2008 NFL Draft. A special teams player for most of his career, Slater is considered one of the NFL's greatest gunners. He holds the record for special teams Pro Bowl selections at 10, in addition to two first-team All-Pros. Slater also won three Super Bowl titles in Super Bowl XLIX, Super Bowl LI, and Super Bowl LIII.

Early years
Slater was born in Long Beach, California to Annie Slater and former NFL tackle and Hall of Famer Jackie Slater. He has a brother named David.

Slater lettered in football for two seasons at Servite High School in Anaheim, California, where he was teammates with Ryan Kalil. Slater was an All-West selection by Prep Star and a three-star selection by Rivals.com. He was also a two-time All-Serra League selection. As a junior, Slater made 23 catches for 333 yards and two touchdowns. As a senior, he had 39 receptions for 707 yards and five touchdowns.

In high school, Slater was also a standout track athlete. He tied for second at the CIF State meet in the 100 meters, with a time of 10.62 seconds, and fourth in the 200 meters, with a time of 21.39 seconds. His 4 × 100 metres relay team was the CIF champion. Slater was selected as the 2003 Orange County Register Boys Track and Field Athlete of the Year as a senior. He still holds school records in the 100 meters and 200 meters.

College career
Slater attended the University of California, Los Angeles and majored in political science and history, while playing for the Bruins football team. As a freshman, he redshirted due to a turf toe injury. In 2004, as a second-year freshman, Slater appeared in games against Illinois, Arizona, and Stanford. As a sophomore in 2005, Slater was a reserve wide receiver. He missed the first three games due to a stress fracture in his left leg. Slater played in two games but did not make a reception.

As a junior in 2006, Slater played 13 games, including two (Washington and Arizona) on defense. He excelled on kick coverage, specializing in big hits on kick returners to help minimize kick return yardage. In the year, he made nine tackles, including six solo tackles. As a senior in 2007, Slater played in 13 games and made 25 tackles. He also returned kicks for the Bruins. He returned 34 kicks for a 29.0-yard average and 3 touchdowns which tied the lead in the nation and set the UCLA record. Slater also tied the Pac-10 season record, set by Anthony Davis in 1974. Slater's 29.0-yard kickoff return average was first in the Pac-10 and 12th-best in the country. He was a first-team All-Pac 10 selection as the kick returner. Slater's 986 kickoff return yards were also a new UCLA single-season record.

Professional career

2008 season: Rookie year
Slater was drafted in the fifth round, 153rd overall, of the 2008 NFL Draft by the New England Patriots, who traded up with the Tampa Bay Buccaneers before drafting Slater. Matthew's father, Jackie Slater, was pleased with the selection and told the Boston Herald that he received phone calls from "scouts, administrators in the NFL who knew me and my son, and they said, ‘Jackie, this could not be a better fit for your son to start being a pro football player.'" Slater was one of two players selected in the 2008 Draft (the other being Chris Long), and the sixth in the history of the NFL Draft, who is a son of a Hall of Fame member. Slater played in 14 games in his rookie 2008 season, returning 11 kickoffs for 155 yards and recording 12 tackles on special teams.

2009 season
In the 2009 season, Slater was active for 14 games for the Patriots, recording six tackles on special teams, while recording one rush for six yards as a wide receiver. He also returned 11 kickoffs for 269 yards, a 24.5 average. Slater had a career-high 35-yard kickoff return in the regular-season finale against the Houston Texans. He also played in a reserve role at wide receiver and on special teams coverage units in the postseason game against the Baltimore Ravens. In that game, Slater had two kickoff returns for 46 yards and a special teams tackle.

2010 season
In 2010, Slater did not record any offensive or defensive statistics and did not return any kicks or punts. However, he led the team with 21 special teams tackles in 15 games played.

2011 season
In the 2011 season, Slater was voted to be the special teams captain by his teammates.

Slater created a niche as a special teams force, leading the Patriots with 17 regular season special teams tackles in 2011; however, he had a presence in all three phases throughout the 2011 season. In the season opener against the Miami Dolphins, Slater made the Patriots’ first big play of the season by catching a 46-yard reception from Tom Brady (which remains his only career reception) and set the team up for the Patriots’ first touchdown of the season. Slater returned four kickoffs for 68 yards (averaging 17 yards per return). He significantly contributed in the defensive backfield, and started in three games as safety. In his defensive start against the Indianapolis Colts, Slater forced a fumble and finished the game with a team-high six tackles. In the AFC Divisional Round, Slater had a special team tackle.

Slater was selected for the 2012 Pro Bowl and the 2011 Pro Football Writers Association (PFW/PFWA) All-Pro teams including All-NFL and All-AFC as a special teamer. At the time, the Slaters were one of five active father-son families selected to at least one Pro Bowl apiece. The others were Gill and Jairus Byrd; Archie and Eli Manning; Archie and Peyton Manning; Clay and Clay Matthews; and Howie and Kyle Long. The Patriots reached Super Bowl XLVI, Slater's first appearance in the Super Bowl, but lost 21–17 to the New York Giants.

2012 season
Slater, who became a free agent after the 2011 season, signed a three-year contract to return to the Patriots in 2012. He was again voted as Special Teams Captain and voted to be the team's player representative to the NFL Players Association. He was named to the Pro Bowl and the 2012 PFW/PFWA All-Pro for the lone AFC special teamer position for the second straight season.

2013 season
In his sixth season with the Patriots, Slater continued to be a reliable captain and inspirational leader on and off the field. He had 14 regular season special-teams tackles, which was the second-highest on the team, despite missing four games early in the season due to injury. Slater's on-field performance led to a third straight Pro Bowl nod.

2014 season
On November 26, 2014, it was reported that Slater signed a two-year contract extension to remain with the Patriots through the 2016 season. Slater, again, was voted All-Pro and to the Pro Bowl at the special teams position. It was his fourth straight selection to the Pro Bowl and his third All-Pro nod. Slater earned a Super Bowl ring as the Patriots defeated the Seattle Seahawks by a score of 28–24 in Super Bowl XLIX.

2015 season
Slater was once again a standout special teams player in 2015. He earned his fifth Pro Bowl at the special teams position. Slater's father is a seven-time Pro Bowler, and with 13 Pro Bowl nods between them, the Slaters are the second-most nominated father/son in the NFL (only Archie and Peyton Manning have more Pro Bowl nominations).

2016 season

On August 31, 2016, Slater signed a one-year contract extension with the Patriots through 2017.

Slater continued to be a standout on special teams. On December 20, he earned his sixth Pro Bowl nomination. The Slaters now held the most Pro Bowl nods of an active father-son pair with 13. He was also named First-team All-Pro as a special teamer for the fourth time in his career. On January 4, 2017, Slater was announced as the winner of the Bart Starr Award, given annually to a player who exemplifies character and leadership on and off the field. His father received this honor in 1996, and together they became the first father-son pair to be honored with this prestigious award. Slater helped the Patriots finish with a 14–2 record. On February 5, 2017, Slater was part of the Patriots team that won Super Bowl LI. In the game, the Patriots defeated the Atlanta Falcons by a score of 34–28 in overtime. Slater had a role as special teams captain and successfully called the coin toss before overtime began.

2017 season
Slater was inactive for the first four games of 2017, recovering from a hamstring injury. He returned in Week 5 but missed Weeks 11–13 with a hamstring injury. Slater was named to a record seven consecutive Pro Bowls, which tied Steve Tasker for the most special teams Pro Bowl honors in NFL history. Slater did not play in the Pro Bowl because his team made it to Super Bowl LII. The Patriots failed to repeat as champions after losing 41-33 to the Philadelphia Eagles.

2018 season
On March 20, 2018, Slater re-signed with the Patriots on a two-year contract. Slater won his third Super Bowl when the Patriots defeated the Los Angeles Rams by a score of 13–3 in Super Bowl LIII.

2019 season

During a Week 4 16-10 road victory over the Buffalo Bills, Slater scored his first NFL touchdown on an 11-yard blocked punt return. In Week 12, he had his first career blocked punt, which led to an offensive touchdown, in a 13-9 win over the Dallas Cowboys, earning AFC Special Teams Player of the Week honors. Slater was named to his eighth Pro Bowl, breaking Steve Tasker's record for the most special teams Pro Bowl honors in NFL history.

2020 season
On March 13, 2020, Slater signed a two-year contract extension with the Patriots. With quarterback Tom Brady's departure and the release of placekicker Stephen Gostkowski, Slater became the longest active member of the Patriots. On December 21, 2020, he was named to the 2020 Pro Bowl, extending his own NFL record for most special teams Pro Bowl honors, with nine selections.

2021 season
Slater was a standout on special teams once more in the 2021 season. He ended the year with 11 tackles in the regular season while adding another two in the Patriots' Wild Card loss to the Buffalo Bills. Slater made his 10th Pro Bowl and was a Second-team All-Pro selection for the third time in his career.

2022 season
On March 14, 2022, Slater signed a one-year contract extension with the Patriots.

2023 season
Slater signed a one-year contract extension on February 17, 2023.

Personal life
In 2020, Slater and his wife founded the Slater Family Foundation. Slater is a Christian.

In 2013, Slater was awarded the New England Patriots 11th Ron Burton Community Service Award by owner Robert Kraft for his strong commitment to community service and leadership. Slater is one of the team’s most active community participants, regularly participating in the team’s organized community events.

Slater was also the United Way representative on the New England Patriots and worked with organizations in the greater Boston area to recruit 1,000,000 volunteers as part of the wider Patriots Celebrate Volunteerism campaign in 2012.

On October 25, 2016, Slater hosted a "pop-up" fundraiser to benefit Hurricane Matthew victims. He raised over $60,000 for Samaritan's Purse to assist in their efforts in the Carolinas and Haiti after the devastating hurricane barreled through those regions.

Slater is a supporter of Compassion International. In 2021, he picked the charity and its “Fill The Stadium” initiative for his “My Cause My Cleats” cause.

See also

National Football League team captains
Gunner (American football)
2007 College Football All-America Team
List of second generation National Football League players

References

External links
New England Patriots bio
UCLA Bruins bio

1985 births
Living people
Sportspeople from Orange, California
Players of American football from California
African-American Christians
African-American players of American football
American football safeties
American football wide receivers
American football return specialists
American Conference Pro Bowl players
Unconferenced Pro Bowl players
UCLA Bruins football players
New England Patriots players
Servite High School alumni
21st-century African-American sportspeople
20th-century African-American people
Ed Block Courage Award recipients